Nelson Cavaquinho (October 29, 1911 – February 18, 1986, birth name Nelson Antônio da Silva) was one of the most important singer/composers of samba. He is usually seen as a representative of the tragic aspects of samba thematics, with many songs about death and hopelessness. He was a prominent figure of samba school Estação Primeira de Mangueira.

Biography
Nelson was born in Rio de Janeiro. Coming from a poor family, he quit school at a young age to seek employment in a factory.  He showed a musical talent at a young age playing a home-made guitar made of a cigar box and wires.  When he could, he would borrow a cavaquinho and try and copy the techniques of professional cavaquinho players. He demonstrated a great ability to play the instrument and composed a choro ("Caminhando") which gained him notoriety as a musician (due in part to an uncommon modulation which made it hard for other instrumentalists to harmonize it).  He was finally given a cavaquinho and having demonstrated a unique playing style on the instrument was given the nickname "Nelson Cavaquinho". He demonstrated a unique style of playing with only two fingers.

As a young man he became acquainted with famous samba players like Cartola, Carlos Cachaça, and Zé da Zilda. He went on to compose over 600 compositions. His main partner was Guilherme de Brito. Some of his better known works are:  "A Flor e o Espinho", "Folhas Secas", "O Bem e o Mal" and  "Juízo Final".

He died of emphysema on February 18, 1986, at the age of 74, in Rio de Janeiro.

References

External links 
 Nelson Cavaquinho - Dicionário Cravo Albin da Música Popular Brasileira

1911 births
1986 deaths
Brazilian composers
20th-century Brazilian male singers
20th-century Brazilian singers
Samba musicians
20th-century composers